Joseph Tetsuro "Joey" Bizinger (born 28 September 1994), known online as The Anime Man, as well as his stage name , is an Australian-Japanese YouTuber, voice actor, songwriter, and podcaster. His video work focuses on Japanese popular culture, which consists of anime and manga reviews, and vlogs on Japanese culture and society. Bizinger is also known for his interviews with people in the Japanese entertainment industry, such as light novel authors, manga artists, and voice actors in anime.

Early life
Bizinger was born in Sydney, New South Wales, on 28 September 1994. He is the son of a Japanese mother and an Australian father of German and Hungarian descent. Bizinger's mother wanted to ensure that he would retain his Japanese heritage by exclusively speaking in Japanese to him and showing him various Japanese anime on home video, with Doraemon, Sazae-san and Pokémon being especially prevalent in his early childhood.

At St Paul's Catholic College in Manly, Bizinger was the only student of Japanese descent in his class and therefore introduced a lot of his friends to anime. The growth of popularity in anime, alongside a school project, spurred him to make a website where he reviewed Japanese animation. He kept making the reviews even after the project ended, and continued to post the reviews until graduation. While studying there, he started to make YouTube videos to be posted on his website, but eventually decided to switch entirely to the platform.

Bizinger attended the University of Sydney, where he graduated in 2016 with a degree in Computer Design Technology.

Career

The Anime Man 
Bizinger began his YouTube career after posting his first video, “Dubbed Anime Sucks!,” on 27 May 2013. With a mixture of vlogs and discussions about various anime and manga, Bizinger would hit his first big milestone, 100,000 subscribers, in 2015. This was soon followed on what is considered his break-out video, “7 Types of Anime Fans,” on 17 June 2015, which ran through the various archetypes that comprise the anime community; a week after its release, Bizinger had doubled his subscriber count. In February 2016, Bizinger created his second channel, Joey, which was initially created as a 'me' channel, but has since evolved into a channel where less polished or various content that does not fit in the main channel are placed.

After graduating from university, in May 2016 Bizinger moved to Japan, where he had originally planned to work in information technology, but by then his YouTube channel had grown so successful that he could work on it full time. In January 2017, The Anime Man hit one million subscribers. From 2017 to 2018, Bizinger co-hosted a weekly SBS podcast titled, The Anime Show, with Agnes Diego (Akidearest), which ran for 68 episodes that discussed anime, manga, and otaku culture.

In 2018, Bizinger was a guest for four episodes in Abroad in Japan's Journey Across Japan series; in which he traveled on bike with British YouTuber Chris Broad, from Niigata to Itoigawa, Japan. The series documented local customs and daily life along the way, while also doing challenges to make it more interesting. In one of the challenges, Broad and Bizinger were able to make a television commercial using Morinaga in Jelly, to which Bizinger created the fictional character “Dr. Jelly.” Bizinger, along with Natsuki Aso, would continue to appear in the follow-up sequels to the series: Escape to Fuji (2020) and The Lost Islands (2021). In June 2021, the single Too Much Volcano! by Abroad in Japan, featuring Bizinger and Aso, was released on the iTunes Store and Spotify; the song and accompanying music video was recorded during the production of The Lost Islands. The song peaked at 65 on the UK downloads charts on 25 June 2021.

Bizinger also began his voice acting career in 2018, with a cameo role in the video game Grisaia Phantom Trigger Vol. 4 and a narration role in an episode of Pop Team Epic. In 2020, he also got the role as Music Elitist in the video game No Straight Roads.

In February 2020, Bizinger joined alongside two other Youtubers, Thai-British Garnt Maneetapho (Gigguk) and Connor Colquhoun (CDawgVA) from Wales, in creating and hosting a weekly audio and video podcast called Trash Taste, where they discuss anime, manga, otaku culture, and their experiences while living in Japan. The first episode was released on 5 June 2020 and all episodes are available on YouTube and major podcast platforms. In February 2022, Bizinger created a third channel, The Anime Man VODs, which feature recordings of his Twitch livestreams.

Musical career 
Bizinger produces music under his other alias Ikurru and released an album on 18 December 2019 entitled A Picture Frame Full Of Memories, performing both piano and vocals. The album references his late grandfather Eishiro Suzuki. Bizinger has released two full-length albums as Ikurru, two EPs (including a collaborative EP with musician Grey Fox), and four standalone singles as of October 2021. Bizinger sings and raps in both English and Japanese in his music.

Personal life
On 4 November 2016, both he and fellow YouTuber Agnes Diego (Akidearest) announced that they were in a relationship.

Discography

Studio albums

Extended plays

Singles

Featured singles

Filmography
Television animation

Video Games

References

External links
 
 

1994 births
Living people
Australian people of Japanese descent
Australian people of German descent
Australian people of Hungarian descent
 Australian YouTubers
Japanese male musicians
Japanese male singers
Japanese male voice actors
Japanese musicians
Japanese pianists
Japanese YouTubers
Commentary YouTubers
Computer designers
English-language YouTube channels
Entertainment-related YouTube channels
Musicians from Sydney
Twitch (service) streamers
University of Sydney alumni
YouTube channels launched in 2013